SCAPER (S-phase CyclinA Associated Protein residing in the Endoplasmic Reticulum) is a gene located on the long arm of chromosome 15 (15q24.3). It was first identified in 2007.

Gene

This gene lies on the Crick strand and has 30 exons.

Protein

The gene encodes a 1399-amino acid  protein with a predicted weight of 158 kiloDaltons. It has a C2H2-type zinc finger motif, a putative transmembrane domain, an ER retrieval signal at the C terminus, 4 coiled-coil domains, 6 potential RXL motifs and 6 consensus Cdk phosphorylation sites.

Biochemistry

The encoded protein is found in the nucleus and endoplasmic reticulum.

It is found in all tissues tested. It appears to have a role in the cell cycle.

Clinical significance

Mutations in this gene have been associated with intellectual disability and retinitis pigmentosa.

References

Genes on human chromosome 15
Proteins